A Man With a Horn is an album by jazz saxophonist Lou Donaldson featuring 1961 & 1963 sessions recorded for the Blue Note label (but not released until 1999), one performed by Donaldson with organist Brother Jack McDuff, guitarist Grant Green and drummer Joe Dukes, and the other with Grant Green, trumpeter Irvin Stokes, Big John Patton and drummer Ben Dixon.

The album was awarded 3 stars in an Allmusic review by Al Campbell, who states "This is a mainly mellow affair with six of the nine tracks exchanging the hard bop and soul-jazz of the times for ballads and slow blues. However, the occasional up-tempo funky surprise does pop up".

Track listing
All compositions by Lou Donaldson except as indicated

 "Misty" (Johnny Burke, Erroll Garner) – 8:32
 "Hippity Hop" – 5:46
 "Please" (Ralph Rainger, Leo Robin) – 6:09
 "My Melancholy Baby" (Ernie Burnett, George Norton) – 6:31
 "The Man With The Horn" (Eddie DeLange, Jack Jenney, Bonnie Lake) – 5:49
 "Cherry Pink (and Apple Blossom White)" (Louis Guglielmi) – 4:24
 "Prisoner of Love" (Russ Columbo, Clarence Gaskill, Leo Robin) – 5:12
 "Soul Meetin' " – 7:13
 "Stardust (Hoagy Carmichael, Mitchell Parish) – 6:12

Recorded on September 25, 1961 (#1, 3, 5, 7, 9) and June 7, 1963 (#2, 4, 6, 8).

Personnel
Tracks 1, 3, 5, 7, 9
Lou Donaldson – alto saxophone
Brother Jack McDuff – organ
Grant Green – guitar
Joe Dukes – drums

Tracks 2, 4, 6, 8
Lou Donaldson – alto saxophone
Irvin Stokes – trumpet
Big John Patton – organ
Grant Green – guitar
Ben Dixon – drums

References

Lou Donaldson albums
1999 albums
Albums produced by Alfred Lion
Blue Note Records albums